My Magic Last Days is a punk-rock, garage, Jewish, industrial dance album, the 21st CD from Jewish-American, bi-polar outsider punk musician, Steve Lieberman, released on 17 July 2012, when he was 54 years old.It was frequently released as a double-record set with My Last Rock Show(2012), in an effort to document the artist's final days on earth through his music. At the time of release, Lieberman's bone-marrow cancer and chemotherapy treatment had progressed to a point where he was forced to retire from decades of live performances and suffered much sickness during the recording and production of  My Magic Last Days.

Critical reception

Martin Atkins 

Martin Atkins had said in his review of My Magic Last Days--"Remember when songs were great and catchy and made you feel good without pandering and such?---This is full of f-ck-off punk with attitude to spare!--Steve Lieberman--Ich Liebe Dich~! "

Rating 131 Stars out of 140

Alex Henderson

"Various musicians have made recordings while suffering major illnesses, quite often having a wistful, introspective quality. But My Magic Last Days is a very noisy, in-your-face cd, rocking angrily and aggressively, recalling the primal rawness of early American and British punk. Lieberman additionally gets a lot of inspirationfrom thrash metal, hard rock and industrial rock, he occasionally employs a Euro-disco/Euro-Dance beat, but without sacrificing his punk and metal appeal....My Magic Last Days does not pretend to be mainstream in any way. The cd is defiantly uncommercial as it is eccentric--a snarling sensory assault!"

Rating: 3.0 Stars out of 5

James McQuiston

"Blending the gritty sound of late-eighties industrial with hints of psychedelic and new-wave...having a bouncy feel, allowing Lieberman's pointed commentary and flutes to shine. Lieberman's desire to keep things fresh needs to be lauded.My Magic Last Days  is one of the best of Lieberman's titles we've reviewed. A really great album could follow.

Rating: 6.8 Stars out of 10

Track listing

Personnel
Steve Lieberman - bass guitar, guitar, vocals, flutes, recorders, trombone, melodica, beatmachines

Singles

References

Steve Lieberman albums
2012 albums
JDub Records albums